Mohammad Aslam (Born September 07,1961) is a former Pakistani-born cricketer who played for the United Arab Emirates national cricket team. He played four One Day Internationals for the UAE.  He played 4 One Day Internationals for UAE and scored 38 runs at an average of 9.50 his highest score was 23.

References

1961 births
Living people
Emirati cricketers
United Arab Emirates One Day International cricketers
Pakistani cricketers
Karachi cricketers
Karachi Whites cricketers
Karachi Blues cricketers
Karachi Greens cricketers
Pakistani emigrants to the United Arab Emirates
Pakistani expatriate sportspeople in the United Arab Emirates
Cricketers from Karachi